Anush Aslibekyan (born March 4, 1981) is an Armenian theater critic, novelist, playwright. Member of the Writers Union of Armenia (2012) and National Theatrical Creative Union. In 2018 Aslibekyan got her PhD in arts. Aslibekyan's works have been translated into Polish, German, Greek and Russian.

Biography 
Anush Aslibekyan was born in 1981 in Sevan. She graduated from the Yerevan State Institute of Theatre and Cinematography, 2003-2006 she did her post-graduate study at the Department of Theatre history and theory of the same Institute. 2000-2005 Anush has been the founder and senior editor at "Arvest" Art Magazine, 2008-2009 - Head of literature department at "Hamazgayin" State Theatre,  2008 – 2010 - TV anchor, reporter, commentator at Ararat TV of Public Television Company of Armenia, since 2008 she is a researcher at Art Institute of the National Academy of Sciences of Armenia, since 2006 she is a Lecturer of Foreign Theatre and Dramaturgy at the Yerevan State Institute of Theatre and Cinema. Since May 2019, along with  literary critic Ani Pashayan, Anush Aslibekyan authored and runs the "Two in Search of an Author" program on "Noah's Arch" channel, dedicated to contemporary literature and art.

Festivals and stage performances 
 "Mercedes" play, was performed at Yerevan State Youth Theatre, 2015, Yerevan, National Theater Prize "Artavazd" for Best Original Music (Vahan Artsruni) for performance and Best Young Actress, 2016 
 "Komitas: The Blessing Light" play, was performed in Saint Petersburg-2015 
 "It’s about You" based on the stories from "Welcome to My Fairy-Tale", was performed on the small stage of Yerevan State Puppet Theater - 2014  Armenian Art-Fest Prize as Best performance (bronze medal)
 "Flight over the city’’ play, was performed at Puppet theater-2010, Yerevan, National Theater Prize "Artavazd" for Best stenography for performance, 2011

Awards 
 YEREVAN BOOK FEST - 2017
 The best Writer of the Year Armenian internet competicion - 2013  
 Best Editor Prize, Contest of Student Magazines "Medicus Days" – 2003
 The Best Diploma Work, Yerevan State Institute of Theatre and Cinema – 2003
 The Best Young Writer, Yerevan State Institute of Theatre and Cinematography – 1999

Publication 
 "Welcome to my fairy tell’’ book of stories and one play, "Graber" publishing house, Yerevan-2009
 "From Moyra’s Diary" book of stories and one play, "Apolon" publishing house, Yerevan-2014
 Dozen of publication in republican, scientific and literary media – 1999–present
 "Flight over the City", Plays, "Armav" publishing, 2018, 119p.
 "Professor", Novella, "Armav" publishing, 2019, 43 p.

References

External links 
 "Dear Pamela": premiere in film actor Henrik Malyan’s theatre
 Actress Nora Armani to star in new play devoted to the Armenian Genocide
 A Culture of Culture Reporting
 Dispatch from Tehran—33rd Annual Fadjr International Theater Festival, Part 2
 It’s About You"
 The Armenian-Russian performance shows the life and legacy of Komitas Vardapet
 Where Have the Women Gone?

1981 births
Armenian novelists
Armenian dramatists and playwrights
Living people
People from Sevan, Armenia